Damon Alley-Tovio is an Australian former professional rugby league footballer who played in the 2000s. He played for South Sydney in the NRL competition.

Background
Alley-Tovio was a South Sydney junior and holds the record for most tries in a Jersey Flegg game when he scored 6 tries against Balmain in the Jersey Flegg Cup.

Playing career
Alley-Tovio made his first grade debut for South Sydney in round 10 2003 against Cronulla-Sutherland at Shark Park which ended in a 14–30 loss.  Alley-Tovio played 2 further games for Souths in the 2003 NRL season as the club finished last on the table.

In the 2004 NRL season, Alley-Tovio only made one appearance for Souths which came against Canterbury-Bankstown in round 7 with the match finishing in an 8–34 loss.  Souths would finish last on the table for a second consecutive year and this would prove to be Alley-Tovio's last game in the top grade.

After being released by Souths, Alley-Tovio played in reserve grade for the Canberra Raiders, St. George Illawarra, Newtown, Canterbury-Bankstown and Penrith.

Controversy
In 2007, Alley-Tovio agreed to hand himself in to police after allegedly assaulting three men inside a hotel and fleeing in a stolen car.  It was reported that a fight began at the Rydges Hotel in Parramatta after Alley-Tovio knocked over a tray of drinks.  After a fight broke out, Alley-Tovio was ejected out of the hotel by security staff.  He then allegedly ran across James Ruse Drive, dodging traffic, and got into a car which was pulled over with the keys in the ignition, but unoccupied. The car was later dumped outside Maroubra police station with the keys in the ignition. Alley-Tovio was suspended by his club Canterbury who he was playing with at the time and was subsequently released.

References

1984 births
Living people
Australian rugby league players
South Sydney Rabbitohs players
Newtown Jets NSW Cup players
Place of birth missing (living people)
Rugby league wingers
Rugby league players from Sydney